The 1973 Italy rugby union tour of South Africa and Rhodesia was a series of matches played between June and 1973 in South Africa and Rhodesia by Italy national rugby union team.

It was the second time that the "Azzurri" toured outside Europe, after a short tour in Madagascar in 1973.

The experience signed a turn in the story of Italian rugby: before of that, contact with the bigger union members was almost non-existent, and limited only to confrontations with France (between 1952 and 1967).

The tour was arranged by Italian federation and SARB, that sent coach Amos du Plooy to Italy to prepare the team. It was an historical tour, but the results were very poor: only a victory against the SARF Leopard selection.

The most important player of the last match, against Transvaal XV, was Rocco Caligiuri: the fly-half (but normally play ad full-back) scored three drops. It was the first time that a player scored three drops in an international match in South Africa. A plate was then put on the wall of Ellis Park Stadium.

Results
Scores and results list Italy's points tally first.

Bibliography 
  Valerio Vecchiarelli, Francesco Volpe, 2000, Italia in meta, GS editore, 2000.

Notes 

Italy
tour
tour
Italy national rugby union team tours
Rugby union tours of South Africa